The Nova Scotia House of Assembly, or Legislative Assembly, is the deliberative assembly of the General Assembly of Nova Scotia of the province of Nova Scotia, Canada. The assembly is the oldest in Canada, having first sat in 1758, and in 1848 was the site of the first responsible government in the British Empire. Bills passed by the House of Assembly are given royal assent by the lieutenant governor of Nova Scotia in the name of the King.

Originally (in 1758), the Legislature consisted of the Crown represented by a governor (later a lieutenant governor), the appointed Nova Scotia Council holding both executive and legislative duties and an elected House of Assembly (lower chamber). In 1838, the council was replaced by an executive council with the executive function and a legislative council with the legislative functions based on the House of Lords.  In 1928, the Legislative Council was abolished and the members pensioned off.

There are 55 Members of the Legislative Assembly (MLAs) representing 55 electoral districts.  (Expanded from 51 electoral districts.) Members nearly always represent one of the three main political parties of the province: the Nova Scotia Liberal Party, Progressive Conservative Party of Nova Scotia, and Nova Scotia New Democratic Party.

The assembly meets in Province House. Located in Halifax, Province House is a National Historic Site and Canada's oldest and smallest legislative building. It opened on February 11, 1819. The building was also originally home to the Supreme Court of Nova Scotia, and the location of the "Freedom of the Press" trial of Joseph Howe. Its main entrance is found on Hollis Street in Halifax.

Officers
A number of officers of the house are appointed in accordance with legislation passed by the house. These officers fulfil numerous functions as prescribed in the relevant legislation. There are two categories of officers:

Officers under the Authority of the Speaker
The Speaker of the House has authority over the following offices and officers:

 Clerk
 Hansard
 House Operations
 Legislative Committees
 Legislative Counsel
 Legislative Library
 Legislative Television Broadcasting Services
 Sergeant-at-Arms
 Speaker’s Administration Office

Independent Officers
These include the Auditor General, the Office of the Ombudsman and the Office of the Conflict of Interest Commissioner.

The Chief Electoral Officer of Nova Officer as head of Elections Nova Scotia is also appointed by a majority vote of the house and is considered an officer of the house.

Party standings

Current members

Committees

Standing Committees
Assembly Matters
Community Services
Natural Resources and Economic Development
Health
Human Resources
Internal Affairs
Law Amendments
Private & Local Bills
Public Accounts
Veterans Affairs

Committees of the Whole House
Bills
Supply
Supply Subcommittee

Select Committee

Recent Former Select Committees
(final reports filed)
Electoral Boundaries 
Fire Safety 
National Unity 
Petroleum Product Pricing 
Workers' Compensation Act

Special Committee
to Review the Estimates of the Auditor General and the Chief Electoral Officer

Seating Plan

Current as of March 2023

See also
List of Nova Scotia General Assemblies
List of political parties in Nova Scotia
Executive Council of Nova Scotia (Cabinet)
Province House (Nova Scotia)
Politics of Nova Scotia

References

External links
Nova Scotia House of Assembly official YouTube channel
Nova Scotia Legislature
Nova Scotia House of Assembly seating plan

Unicameral legislatures
1758 establishments in Nova Scotia
Legislatures of Canadian provinces and territories